Frederick S. Holmes was an American safe and vault engineer and inventor who designed the largest vaults in the world.  During his career, Holmes designed hundreds of vaults throughout the United States, Canada and Japan from 1895 to 1941. The majority of Holmes designed vaults are located in New York's Financial District; many are publicly accessible and in buildings on the National Register of Historic Places.  His name is engraved on the builder's plaques, typically located on the encased jamb controls of these vaults.

Holmes' vault designs evolved over time to keep up with safe-crackers or 'Yeggmen' adept at vault penetration.  A Holmes advertisement reads, "Newly discovered methods of attack necessitate radical departures from hitherto accepted standards of design".  Holmes specialized in jamb-controlled vaults where the combination locks and bolt-throwing mechanism are located inside the vault creating a solid vault door with no spindle holes.  Entry requires two points of attack (door and jamb), which doubles the time required for burglars to breach the vault.

In recognition of their significant contributions to the field of bank vault engineering, the Franklin Institute wrote, “Coincident with the modern development of the safe and bank vault industry was that of the profession of the Bank Vault Engineer.  The industry owes much of its progress to the work done by the pioneers of this profession: William H. Hollar, John M. Mossman, George L. Damon, E. A. Strauss, Frederick S. Holmes, Benjamin F. Tripp, and George L. Remington.”

Holmes collaborated with prominent architects such as Cass Gilbert and Alfred Bossom and leading vault builders including Bethlehem Steel, Carnegie Steel, Damon Safe & Iron Works, Diebold, Herring-Hall-Marvin, J&J Taylor, LH Miller Safe & Iron Works, Mosler Safe, Remington & Sherman, and York Safe & Lock.

Career

Published works
Includes copyrights, court testimony, interviews, patents, quotes, and speeches in chronological order

References

External links
 Holmes Advertisements
 Holmes Biographical Info
 Holmes Vault Door Jamb Controls
 Holmes Vault Inventory (200+) coming soon

American inventors
Banking
Federal Reserve Bank buildings
Financial District, Manhattan
Locks (security device)
Mechanical engineering
Security engineering